David Leworthy (born 22 October 1962) is a retired English footballer who played as a centre forward.

Career
Leworthy started his career with his hometown club Portsmouth. After spending 9 years with Pompey, from the age of 10, he moved to Non-League Fareham Town where his prolific goalscoring record there earned him a dream move to Tottenham Hotspur. Leworthy made his Spurs debut in the North London derby, against arch rivals Arsenal, that ended in a 2–0 defeat at White Hart Lane in front of a crowd of 40,399 on 17 April 1985. He played alongside the likes of Glenn Hoddle, Ossie Ardillies, Graham Roberts and Steve Perryman and went on to make a further ten appearances in total, scoring 4 goals.

In December 1985, Leworthy moved to fellow First Division side Oxford Utd for a transfer fee of £200,000. He spent 4 years at the club and made 37 appearances, scoring 8 goals - most notably against Manchester United. Following a loan spell at Shrewsbury Town, he then moved to Reading in 1989 where he would spend 3 years. He was loaned to Colchester Utd towards the end of the 1990/1991 season, scoring 4 goals in 9 appearances and helping the U's to a 2nd-place finish in the Vauxhall Conference as runners-up to Barnet.

Leworthy returned to the Vauxhall Conference the following season with Farnborough Town, following a permanent switch from Reading ahead of the 1991/1992 season. Leworthy had a couple of very successful seasons at Cherrywood Road and finished the 1992/1993 season as the Vauxhall Conference top goalscorer with 32 League goals (39 in all competitions) despite the club being relegated. He remained in the division following Farnborough's relegation and was sold to newly promoted Dover Athletic in a move that saw the non-league transfer record broken when the Kent club paid £50,000 for his services. Leworthy continued his prolific goalscoring exploits at Crabble and scored 86 times in a total of 158 appearances. He netted all four goals in Dover's 4–3 win over Woking in February 1996 and, ironically, netted a hat-trick in the very same fixture the following season, just seven months later, which ended in 5–1 victory for Dover in September 1996.

In January 1997 Leworthy moved to fellow Football Conference side Rushden & Diamonds for a fee of £15,000, and his goals in the final 4 months of the season, including a debut goal against his former club Farnborough Town, helped ease the club away from the relegation zone and into a midtable finish. However, his stay at Rushden didn't last long, and at the end of the season he moved to South-West London club Kingstonian for a club record fee of £18,000. Leworthy was part of the Kingstonian side that celebrated two consecutive FA Trophy wins at Wembley Stadium in 1999 and 2000.

Leworthy's career began to draw to a close with a period at Conference South club Havant & Waterlooville that included a spell as manager.

Leworthy came out of retirement in 2006 for a brief second spell at Kingstonian. He was named manager of Banstead Athletic of the Combined Counties League Premier Division in December 2007. He left Banstead in October 2008 and became joint manager of Croydon alongside Peter Thomas in November. Peter Thomas left the club in January the following year.

Leworthy is now long retired from the game but still supports his hometown club Portsmouth.

Honours

Club
Colchester United
 Football Conference Runner-up (1): 1990–91

Kingstonian
 FA Trophy Winner (2): 1998–99, 1999–2000
 Bob Lord Trophy Runner-up (2): 1999–2000

References

External links

Dave Leworthy at Neil Brown's
David Leworthy at Coludata.co.uk

1962 births
Living people
Footballers from Portsmouth
English footballers
Association football forwards
Portsmouth F.C. players
Tottenham Hotspur F.C. players
Oxford United F.C. players
Reading F.C. players
Colchester United F.C. players
Shrewsbury Town F.C. players
Farnborough F.C. players
Dover Athletic F.C. players
Rushden & Diamonds F.C. players
Kingstonian F.C. players
Havant & Waterlooville F.C. players
Fareham Town F.C. players
English Football League players
Dover Athletic F.C. managers
Banstead Athletic F.C. managers
Havant & Waterlooville F.C. managers
Croydon F.C. managers
English football managers